Maulvi Sher Ahmad Ammar (مولوی شیر احمد عمار مجاهد) is an Afghan Taliban politician, Islamic scholar and Sheikh-ul-Hadith. He is currently serving as Deputy governor of Maidan Wardak Province since 8 November 2021. He has also served as deputy governor of Herat Province in Afghanistan from 25 September 2021 to 26 October 2021.

References 

Deputy governors of Herat Province
Living people
Year of birth missing (living people)
Place of birth missing (living people)
Taliban governors